John Donaldson (15 October 1841 – 25 July 1896) was a politician in colonial Queensland, Colonial Treasurer from 19 November 1889 to 12 August 1890.

Donaldson was born at Purdeet, Victoria, Australia, and engaged in squatting pursuits, proceeding to New South Wales in 1876, and to Queensland in 1881.

Donaldson was returned to the Queensland Legislative Assembly for Warrego on 5 October 1883 holding that seat until 19 May 1888; later he represented Bulloo from 26 May 1888 to 25 April 1893 and then Logan from 4 April 1896 until his death on 25 July 1896.

Donaldson was appointed Postmaster-General of Queensland and Secretary for Public Instruction in the Thomas McIlwraith Ministry on 13 June  1888; and when the ministry was reconstructed under Boyd Dunlop Morehead, on 30 November in that year, continued to hold the same posts until 19 November 1889, when he succeeded William Pattison as Colonial Treasurer. He resigned with his colleagues in August 1890, owing to the opposition of the Assembly to his financial proposals. Donaldson was one of the Queensland delegates to the Federation Convention held at Sydney in March 1891.

Donaldson died in Coorparoo, Queensland on 25 July 1896, survived by his second wife Gertrude Evelyn née Willis, two sons by his first marriage (to Margaret, née Walker, married in 1869; predeceased Donaldson) and a son and two daughters by his second marriage.

Following a short service at his late Coorparoo residence, Donaldson was buried in Toowong Cemetery.

References

1841 births
1896 deaths
Members of the Queensland Legislative Assembly
Treasurers of Queensland
People from Victoria (Australia)
19th-century Australian politicians